Evaluative conditioning is defined as a change in the valence of a stimulus that is due to the pairing of that stimulus with another positive or negative stimulus. The first stimulus is often referred to as the conditioned stimulus and the second stimulus as the unconditioned stimulus. A conditioned stimulus becomes more positive when it has been paired with a positive unconditioned stimulus and more negative when it has been paired with a negative unconditioned stimulus. Evaluative conditioning thus refers to attitude formation or change toward an object due to that object's mere co-occurrence with another object.

Evaluative conditioning is a form of classical conditioning, as invented by Ivan Pavlov, in that it involves a change in the responses to the conditioned stimulus that results from pairing the conditioned stimulus with an unconditioned stimulus. Whereas classic conditioning can refer to a change in any type of response, evaluative conditioning concerns only a change in the evaluative responses to the conditioned stimulus, that is, a change in the liking of the conditioned stimulus.

A classic example of the formation of attitudes through conditioning is the 1958 experiment by Staats and Staats. Subjects first were asked to learn a list of words that were presented visually, and were tested on their learning of the list. They then did the same with a list of words presented orally, all of which set the stage for the critical phase of the experiment which was portrayed as an assessment of subjects' ability to learn via both visual and auditory channels at once. During this phase, subjects were exposed visually to a set of nationality names, specifically Dutch and Swedish. Approximately one second after the nationality appeared on the screen, the experimenter announced a word aloud. Most of these latter words, none of which were repeated, were neutral (e.g., chair, with, twelve). Included, however, were a few positive words (e.g., gift, sacred, happy) and a few negative words (e.g., bitter, ugly, failure). These words were systematically paired with the two conditional stimuli nationalities such that one always appeared with positive words and the other with negative words. Thus, the conditioning trials were embedded within a stream of visually presented nationality names and orally presented words. When the conditioning phase was completed, the subjects were first asked to recall the words that had been presented visually and then to evaluate them, presumably because how they felt about those words might have affected their learning. The conditioning was successful. The nationality that had been paired with the more positive unconditional stimuli was rated as more pleasant than the one paired with the negative unconditional stimuli.

References

Notes

Sources
 
 
 

Experimental psychology
Behavioral concepts
History of psychology
Behaviorism
Learning